Triggerfish is a computer animation film studio based in Cape Town, South Africa and Galway, Ireland. The studio is best known for its animated feature films Adventures in Zambezia (2012), Khumba (2013), and Seal Team (2021), as well as the work they have done on television specials created for UK producers Magic Light Pictures. In 2016, Stick Man was awarded the Cristal for best TV production at the Annecy International Animation Festival. In 2017, Revolting Rhymes again won the Cristal for best TV production at the Annecy Festival, and was nominated for the Best Short Film (Animated) Oscar at the 2018 Academy Awards. In 2019, Netflix  announced that Triggerfish would produce its first African animated TV series. In 2020, Zog won the International Emmy for Best Kids Animation. In 2021, The Snail and The Whale won Best Special Production at The Annie Awards, while Triggerfish received the Mifa Animation Industry Award at Annecy for "the pioneering role that the company has played in animation in South Africa, and Africa most widely.” In 2022, their third film, Seal Team, made the Netflix Top 10 Films global list for its launch week.

History
Triggerfish was established in 1996 by Jacquie Trowell and Emma Kaye in Cape Town, South Africa. As a stop-motion animation studio, it produced multiple commercials for South African ad agencies. From 1998 through 2008, Triggerfish produced animation for Sesame Workshop for the South African version of Sesame Street, Takalani Sesame, as well as the US domestic and international versions of the pre-school kids' program.

Stuart Forrest joined as a junior animator in 2002 to work on Takalani Sesame for seasons two and three. In 2004, Forrest and James Middleton became partners in Triggerfish and in 2005 became the sole partners when the original founders left the company. In 2007, Anthony Silverston joined as creative director, and Mike Buckland joined as head of production. At the same time, the company moved away from stop-frame animation and relaunched as a computer animation studio.

In 2015, at the Premier’s Entrepreneurship Recognition Awards (PERA), Triggerfish was named Business of the Year by the Western Cape Government.

In 2021, Triggerfish received the Mifa Animation Industry Award at Annecy for "the pioneering role that the company has played in animation in South Africa, and Africa most widely.”

Short films 
In 2008, Triggerfish created a 30-minute short entitled The Rise and Fall of Tony the Frog. The short was produced by Ambient Animation in Cape Town for Isaac Entertainment.

In 2018, Triggerfish released an original 4-minute short entitled Belly Flop, co-directed by Jeremy Collins and writer Kelly Dillon. This was one of four shorts screened during the closing ceremony at Annecy 2018.  A second original short film,Troll Girl premiered at the Cape Town International Animation Festival in 2021.

Triggerfish was one of nine studios selected around the world to produce a short for Star Wars Visions 2 anthology. The short, entitled "Aau's song", will be released on 4 May 2023.

Feature films 
From 2006, the team began to shift focus to motion pictures by writing their first script Adventures in Zambezia, with US-based rights company Wonderful Works. The script went into production in 2009 and was released in 2012. In 2010, the studio started production on Khumba which started its worldwide release in Q3 2013. Triggerfish's third feature, called Seal Team., premiered on Netflix on 31 December 2021.

Television animated series
On April 16, 2019, it was announced that Netflix had given a series order for the animated superhero series Mama K's Team 4. The series is expected to be produced by the studio in collaboration with CAKE. Malenga Mulendema will be credited as an executive producer and writer of the series.

In February 2021, it was announced that eOne had greenlit the animated superhero series Kiya, about a seven-year-old African girl whose passions in life are dancing and martial arts. The original idea for Kiya was created by Kelly Dillon and Marc Dey, then developed for television by Robert Vargas.  Kiya will launch in 2023 across linear and streaming platforms including Disney Jr., Disney + globally, and France Télévisions.

In June 2021, it was announced that Disney+ had greenlit Triggerfish's animated anthology series Kizazi Moto. Inspired by the continent’s diverse histories and cultures, the 10-part anthology brings together a slate of rising animation talents from six African nations to produce action-packed sci-fi and fantasy stories that will present bold visions of advanced technology, aliens, spirits and monsters imagined from uniquely African perspectives.

Oscar-winning director Peter Ramsey (“Spider-Man: Into the Spider-Verse”) will serve as executive producer, with Tendayi Nyeke and Anthony Silverston as supervising producers. Triggerfish will be the lead studio for the anthology, working in collaboration with animation studios across the continent and globally. The development process was curated and produced by the team at Triggerfish, including supervising producer Tendayi Nyeke, head of development Anthony Silverston, and Kevin Kriedemann, who proposed the initial idea for the anthology.

The final 10 films are from Ahmed Teilab (Egypt), Simangaliso “Panda” Sibaya and Malcolm Wope (South Africa), Terence Maluleke and Isaac Mogajane (South Africa), Ng’endo Mukii (Kenya), Shofela Coker (Nigeria), Nthato Mokgata and Terence Neale (South Africa), Pious Nyenyewa and Tafadzwa Hove (Zimbabwe), Tshepo Moche (South Africa), Raymond Malinga (Uganda) and Lesego Vorster (South Africa).

Each film will be roughly 10 minutes long, and together will comprise a feature-length anthology of original animation that will be released as a Disney Plus Original across the globe.

Story Lab 
In mid-2015, Triggerfish announced the Triggerfish Story Lab, a program that aimed to develop African writers and directors.  The initiative had the support of the Walt Disney Company. Mama K's Team 4, the first Netflix Original animation series from Africa, was one of the projects unearthed by the Triggerfish Story Lab. A second TV series from the Triggerfish Story Lab, Kiya! (previously Ninja Princess), was announced in February 2021 to have been picked up by Disney+.

Triggerfish Academy 
In June 2019 Triggerfish launched a free online learning platform aimed at encouraging young creatives to create their first animated film.

Filmography
Feature films
{|class="wikitable sortable" style="text-align: right;"
|-
! width=10 | #
!! style="width:321px;"| Title
!! style="width:110px;"| Release date
!! width=75 | Budget
!! width=75 | Gross
!! width=50 | Rotten Tomatoes
!! width=50 | Metacritic
|-
| style="text-align:center;"| 1 
| style="text-align:left;"| Adventures in Zambezia 
| 
| $20,000,000 
| $34,428,345
| 25%
| N/A
|-
| style="text-align:center;"| 2 
| style="text-align:left;"| Khumba 
| 
| $20,000,000 
| $27,000,000
| 44%
| 40
|-
| style="text-align:center;"| 3
| style="text-align:left;"| Seal Team |
|
|
|
|
|}

Television specials

Television series

Feature Film Awards & Nominations

 Adventures in Zambezia 
 2012 Best South African Feature Film at The Durban International Film Festival
 2012 Best Animation at South African Film and Television Awards
 2013 Best Animation at Africa Movie Academy Awards
 2013 Best Children's Feature at Anima Mundi
 Nominated for Best Music in An Animated Feature (Bruce Retief) and Voice Acting In An Animated Feature (Jim Cummings) at the 2013 Annie Awards
 Nominated for Best Male Vocal Performance in An Animated Feature (Jim Cummings) at the 2013 Behind The Voice Actors Awards
 Nominated for Best Director (Wayne Thornley) & Best Original Score (Feature Film) at the 2013 South African Film and Television Awards

 Khumba 
Prior to its release, Khumba'' screened in competition at Annecy International Animation Festival 2013, where it was nominated for the Cristal, and was in the Official Selection of Durban International Film Festival and Toronto International Film Festival 2013.
 Gold Panda Award for Best Foreign Animation (2013)
 Gold Panda Award for Grand Prize (2013)
 2014 Best Animation at South African Film and Television Awards
 2014 Best Music Composition for a feature film at South African Film and Television Awards
 2014 Best Animation at Africa Movie Academy Awards
 Nominated for Best Male Vocal Performance (Liam Neeson and Steve Buscemi), 2015 Behind The Voice Actor Awards

Short Films Awards & Nominations

Belly Flop 
 2018 Gryphon Award for Best Short 6+ at Giffoni
 2018 Best Animation, Africa Movie Academy Awards
 2019 Audience Prize: Favorite Short Animated Film, Children's Film Festival Seattle
 2018 Children's Jury Award at Cinemira in Budapest
 2018 Best In Show and Best In 3D at Longwood Animation Film Festival
 2018 Czech TV Audience Award at Zlin Film Festival
 2018 Special Mention at Cinema In Sneakers Film Festival in Warsaw
 2018 Best Local Film at Kleinkaap Short Film Festival 
 2018 Family Shorts Award at Tenerife International Short Film Festival
 2018 Audience Award: Best Short Film at Animatopia ICAF
 2019 Special Jury Award at CMS International Children's Film Festival
 2019 2nd Place: Best Short Film at Kingstoon International Animated Film Competition
 2019 Grand Prize: Short Film at Seoul Guro Kids Film Festival 
 2019 Audience Award for Best Short Animation at Festival Internacional de Cine para Niños
 2019 Audience Award for Best Short Animation at Madrid Film Festival FCM-PNR

TV Series Awards and Nominations

References

External links
 
 

South African animation studios
Companies based in Cape Town
Mass media companies established in 1996
Mass media in Cape Town